SS George G. Crawford was a Liberty ship built in the United States during World War II. She was named after George G. Crawford, the president of the Tennessee Coal, Iron and Railroad Company in Birmingham, Alabama and later president of the Jones and Laughlin Steel Company in Pittsburgh, Pennsylvania.

Construction
George G. Crawford was laid down on 16 November 1943, under a Maritime Commission (MARCOM) contract, MC hull 1510, by J.A. Jones Construction, Brunswick, Georgia; she was sponsored by Mrs. I.M. Aiden, and launched on 1 January 1944.

History
She was allocated to the American Liberty Steamship Co., on 13 January 1944. On 21 September 1945, she was  laid up in the National Defense Reserve Fleet in the James River Group, Lee Hall, Virginia. On 20 February 1947, she was sold to John Theodorakopoulos and Manuel E. Kulukundis, for $544,506, for commercial use. She was withdrawn from the fleet on 27 February 1947. She was renamed Megalohar and scrapped in February 1968.

References

Bibliography

 
 
 
 
 

 

Liberty ships
Ships built in Brunswick, Georgia
1944 ships
James River Reserve Fleet
Liberty ships transferred to Greece